Leif Larsson is a former international speedway rider from Sweden.

Speedway career 
Larsson reached the final of the Speedway World Championship in the 1965 Individual Speedway World Championship.

He rode in the top tier of British Speedway in 1962, riding for Ipswich Witches.

World final appearances

Individual World Championship
 1961 –  Malmö, Malmö Stadion – Reserve – Did not Ride
 1965 –  London, Wembley Stadium – 11th – 5pts
 1966 -  Göteborg, Ullevi - 14th - 3pts

World Team Cup
 1966 -  Wrocław, Olympic Stadium (with Björn Knutsson / Leif Enecrona / Göte Nordin / Ove Fundin) - 3rd - 22pts (2)

References 

Swedish speedway riders
Ipswich Witches riders
Living people
Year of birth missing (living people)